The 2021 Northern Colorado Bears football team represented the University of Northern Colorado as a member of the Big Sky Conference during the 2021 NCAA Division I FCS football season. They were led by first-year head coach Ed McCaffrey and played their home games at Nottingham Field.

Previous season
The Bears finished the 2019 season 2–10, 2–6 in Big Sky play to finish in a five-way tie for ninth place. On November 24, head coach Earnest Collins Jr.  was fired after nine seasons. He finished at Northern Colorado with a record of 28–72. The Bears opted out in the 2020 fall season and 2021 spring season.

Preseason

Big Sky preseason poll
On July 26, 2021, during the virtual Big Sky Kickoff, the Mustangs were predicted to finish in the Big Sky last in the media and twelfth in the coaches.

Preseason All-Big Sky team
The Bears did not have any players selected to the preseason all-Big Sky team.

Schedule

Source: Schedule

Game summaries

at Colorado

at Houston Baptist

Lamar

Northern Arizona

at No. 11 Montana State

No. 4 Eastern Washington

at No. 13 UC Davis

at Southern Utah

No. 15 Sacramento State

No. 11 Montana

at Weber State

References

Northern Colorado
Northern Colorado Bears football seasons
Northern Colorado Bears football